Colonel Nguyễn Văn Nghĩa (born 1946) was a Mikoyan-Gurevich MiG-21 pilot of the Vietnamese People's Air Force, he flew with the 927th fighter regiment and tied for fifth place amongst Vietnam War fighter aces with five kills.

The following kills are known to be credited to him by the VPAF:
 23 June 1972, an F-4 Phantom (U.S. side does not confirm); 
 24 June 1972, a USAF F-4C (serial number 66-7636, 25th Tactical Fighter Squadron), pilot McCarty (KIA), WSO Jackson (POW);
 6 October 1972, a USAF F-4E, pilot White, WSO Egge (both rescued);
 24 November 1972, Ryan 147 Firebee/Lightning Bug drone;
 23 December 1972, an F-4 Phantom (U.S. side does not confirm).

See also
 List of Vietnam War flying aces

References

Bibliography

North Vietnamese military personnel of the Vietnam War
North Vietnamese Vietnam War flying aces
Living people
1946 births